is a sports simulation video game developed and published by Nintendo for the Nintendo Switch. It is the latest entry in the Wii series of games and the fourth game of the Wii Sports sub-series, as well as the first to replace the "Wii" title. The game was released on April 29, 2022, and received generally mixed reviews from critics. Nintendo Switch Sports has sold over 8.61 million copies as of December 31, 2022, making it one of the best-selling Nintendo Switch games.

Gameplay 

Nintendo Switch Sports is set in a fictional multi-sport facility named Spocco Square, which contains three sports from previous installments (tennis and bowling from  Wii Sports and swordplay from Wii Sports Resort; the latter is referred to as chambara within the game), and three new sports (soccer, volleyball, and badminton). Another sport from a previous installment, golf, was announced as well and was issued in a free update on November 29, 2022.

Players utilize the Nintendo Switch's Joy-Con in a similar manner to the other Wii Sports games, positioning them in a manner resembling the actual sport. The gyroscope functionality embedded within the Joy-Con are used to simulate motion in-game, compared to the usage of the Wii Remote (and occasionally the Nunchuk) to simulate motion in the other games in the series.

Alongside Miis, new avatars called "Sportsmates" have been introduced, which have more detailed hair and faces as well as arms and legs. Additionally, the Leg Strap accessory introduced in Ring Fit Adventure is included in the physical copy of the game and is usable in Football. At launch, the leg strap only worked for Football Shootout Mode. As of the Summer update launched in July 2022, the leg strap can now be used for all Football match types.

The game has multiplayer available both locally on the same system and online. Online allows play with friends and random matchmaking.

Development 
The game was announced in a Nintendo Direct on February 9, 2022, with a release date of April 29, 2022. A free-to-play online playtest of the game to test functionality and stability was available to register on February 15, 2022, for those with a Nintendo Switch Online subscription. The playtest was available to play during specific times on February 18 to 20, 2022.

Takayuki Shimamura, who directed all of the Wii Sports series, returned to this title as producer, Yoshikazu Yamashita, who directed Wii Sports and Wii Sports Resort, returned as director. The project started a while after the Nintendo Switch system was released. Yoshiaki Koizumi, Senior Executive Officer, Deputy General Manager of Nintendo EPD and general producer of the Nintendo Switch, called Yamashita and requested the development of a Nintendo Switch title in the Wii Sports series. According to Yamashita, 90% of the members of the development team were new members who weren't part of the past Wii series titles.

Development of post-release content has faced setbacks. In September 2022, Nintendo announced that the golf game mode, which was previously targeted for release in fall 2022, would be delayed to winter. In October 2022, an update intended to address cheating in online play was released with a bug that caused the game to crash in both online and offline modes, forcing Nintendo to stop distributing the update and take the game's servers offline until a solution could be found.

Reception
According to review aggregator Metacritic, the game received "mixed or average" reviews from critics upon release.

Nintendo World Report praised the minigames for being easy to pick up, but criticized the Joy-Con motion controls, saying that it had "removed a little bit of variance and nuance". GamesRadar+ liked the new soccer mini game, writing that it was "brilliantly chaotic when another human player gets involved in local multiplayer". While enjoying the game for family-friendly entertainment, The Guardian disliked volleyball, stating, "the pace is slow and the movements too obvious". VG247 felt that the motions used in each game captured the feeling of the sports, even if they were only approximations.

Game Informer enjoyed the gear unlock system in the game, "this simple progression system kept me engaged and eager to dive back into the action". On the other hand, Destructoid criticized it for being too online-centric, "all of the game’s long-term reward systems are directly linked to online play... For a game that made its money on local play, this seems like a bummer". IGN liked the flexibility of badminton, and called attention to its use of HD Rumble, saying that the Joy-Con gave off "precise haptic feedback that I could feel in my hand whenever the racquet connected with the birdie to make a satisfying *ting* sensation". The Verge disliked the simplicity of the racquet-based sports, "The games are still fun, but I wish I could have had more strategy to play them than 'swing your arm and pray'". The Washington Post felt that the AI partner could make it too easy on the player, writing, "My ever-flexible AI partner could work around just about anything to bail me out. I don’t think I ever really lost unless I completely whiffed on an attempt".

Nintendo Life wrote that the game suffered from a lack of content outside the main sports, "If you want to play one of the six sports, you're golden. If you want anything to spice it up, you're more than likely going to be left wanting. We know we were". GameSpot criticized the lack of single-player options, saying "It quickly began feeling repetitive... If playing Nintendo Switch Sports with others is a joyous communal experience, playing alone is a depressingly isolating one". Polygon felt it captured the joy of the original Wii Sports, but noted that the motion controls felt like a step down from Resort.

Sales 
The game sold nearly 190,000 copies in its first week in Japan, topping the weekly sales chart. Similarly, the game topped the weekly sales chart in the UK, South Korea and Taiwan. In the United States, it charted at number 5 for the month of April based on physical sales alone, becoming the second best-selling new release of the month, behind Lego Star Wars: The Skywalker Saga.

As of June 30, 2022, Nintendo Switch Sports has sold 4.84 million copies worldwide.

It was nominated for the British Academy Games Award for Family at the 19th British Academy Games Awards.

Notes

References

External links 
 

2022 video games
Bowling video games
Volleyball video games
Multiple-sport video games
Nintendo Switch games
Nintendo Switch-only games
Nintendo games
Tennis video games
Association football video games
Golf video games
Video games developed in Japan